Wilkins Perryman Horton (September 1, 1889 – 1950) was the 18th Lieutenant Governor of North Carolina from 1937 to 1941 serving under Governor Clyde R. Hoey.

Horton was born in Kansas City, Kansas on September 1, 1889. He practiced law and was elected to the North Carolina Senate from the Chatham County area, serving in 1919, 1927, 1931, and 1935. In 1940, barred by the state constitution of the time from running for a second term as lieutenant governor, Horton ran for governor, but lost the Democratic primary election to J. Melville Broughton.

References
The Political Graveyard
OurCampaigns.com
Index to the Dictionary of North Carolina Biography

1889 births
1950 deaths
Politicians from Kansas City, Kansas
Democratic Party North Carolina state senators
Lieutenant Governors of North Carolina
People from Chatham County, North Carolina
20th-century American politicians